Simeon Bavier (16 September 1825 – 27 January 1896) was a Swiss politician, member of the Swiss Federal Council (1878-1883).

He was elected to the Swiss Federal Council on 10 December 1878 and resigned on 5 January 1883. He was affiliated with the Free Democratic Party of Switzerland. During his time in office he held the following departments:
 Department of Finance (1879)
 Department of Posts and Railways (1880 - 1881)
 Political Department (1882) as President of the Confederation

He was President of the Confederation in 1882.

References

External links

1825 births
1896 deaths
People from Chur
Swiss Calvinist and Reformed Christians
Free Democratic Party of Switzerland politicians
Foreign ministers of Switzerland
Finance ministers of Switzerland
Members of the Federal Council (Switzerland)
Members of the National Council (Switzerland)